Tully is a town and locality in the Cassowary Coast Region, Queensland, Australia. Tully is perhaps best known for being one of the wettest towns in Australia and home to the 7.9 metre tall Golden Gumboot.

The Tully River (previously known as the Mackay River) was named after Surveyor-General William Alcock Tully in the 1870s. The town of Tully was named after the river when it was surveyed during the erection of the sugar mill in 1924 (although the river does not flow through the town or the locality). During the previous decade, a settlement known as Banyan had grown up on the other side of Banyan Creek.

Tully is one of the larger towns of the Cassowary Coast Region. The economic base of the region is agriculture: sugar cane and bananas are the dominant crops. The sugar cane grown at the many farms in the district is processed locally at the Tully Sugar Mill, and the raw sugar produced is shipped elsewhere for further refining.

History

Dyirbal (also known as Djirbal) is a language of Far North Queensland, particularly the area around Tully and Tully River Catchment extending to the Atherton Tablelands. The Dyirbal language region includes the landscape within the local government boundaries of Cassowary Coast Regional Council and Tablelands Regional Council.

The Tully River area was slowly settled once Cardwell, to the south, was established. The river was renamed in 1872 in honour of William Alcock Tully, then under-secretary for public lands and chief commissioner of crown lands in Queensland and later Surveyor General of Queensland. The first settlers were the nephews of James Tyson, who  raised beef cattle. It was not until the government constructed a sugar mill in 1925 that the town began to develop.

Augustinian priests based in Innisfail began to conduct Roman Catholic services in Tully in 1926. Vicar Apostolic of Cooktown John Heavey laid the foundation stone for a church dedicated to St Clare of Montefalco on 7 May 1926. St Clare's Catholic School was established in 1928 by the Sisters of the Good Samaritan. A separate Tully Parish of the Roman Catholic Vicariate Apostolic of Cooktown (now the Roman Catholic Diocese of Cairns) was established in 1935.

Tully was originally within the Cardwell Division, which became the Shire of Cardwell in 1903. The first headquarters for the division/shire were in older town of Cardwell. In 1929, the decision was taken to relocate the shire council's headquarters to the newer but more populous town of Tully. The first council meeting held in Tully was on 27 June 1929. A new shire chambers was built in 1930 on the south-east corner of Bryant and Morris Streets.

Tully remained the administrative centre for the Shire of Cardwell, until the shire was amalgamated into the Cassowary Coast Region in 2008. The regional council has its headquarters in Innisfail.

In 2019, Tully became the inaugural winner of a Loud Shirt Day competition to find Queensland's Loudest Town. Inspired by a local story, and facing strong competition from other regional Queensland towns, members of the community rallied together to raise $13,410 to support services provided to young people with hearing loss.

Heritage listings 
Tully has a number of heritage-listed sites, including:
 17 Mars Street: Tully State School
 69 Bryant Street: Tully Court House

Climate

Owing to its strong exposure to the southeasterly trade winds, Tully has a tropical rainforest climate (Köppen climate classification Af). With an average annual rainfall exceeding , and the highest-ever annual rainfall in a populated area of Australia ( in 1950), Tully is arguably the wettest town in Australia. However, a rivalry exists between Tully and the nearby town of Babinda for that title. Although Tully's average rainfall is less than that of Babinda, a giant gumboot (the "Golden Gumboot") was erected in Tully in 2003, as a monument to the town's high rainfall. It also serves as a museum, documenting past floods, as well as displaying the rainfall for the current year.

Cyclone Yasi 
Buildings in Tully were badly damaged by Cyclone Yasi on 3 February 2011. According to residents, Tully was "...a scene of mass devastation". Many other homes not destroyed sustained severe façade and or roof damage. As daybreak came, reports from the town stated that about 90 percent of the structures along the main avenue sustained extensive damage.

Agriculture 

In March 2015, a farm at Tully tested positive for the soil-borne Panama disease.  Follow-up testing confirmed the results.  One of the strains of the disease affects all types of bananas and has previously only been detected in the Northern Territory.  Harvesting continued on the property with strict protocols allowing the farm to continue to operate and distribute product without posing a threat.

Outside experts were brought in to review Biosecurity Queensland's performance 15 February to 24 May 2021. Their assessment credits BQ with quick and effective response which is being emulated by other countries. Thus far TR4 continues to be contained to the Tully Valley only and containment is thought to be possible as long as accidental human movement and transport in flowing water can be halted.

Amenities 
The Cassowary Coast Regional Council operates the Dorothy Jones Library at 34 Bryant Street, Tully.

The Tully branch of the Queensland Country Women's Association meets at the CWA Hall at 5 Plumb Street.

St Claire of Montefalco Catholic Church is at 13 Mars Street. It is within the Tully Parish of the Roman Catholic Diocese of Cairns.

Transport 

Tully Railway Station is a prominent station on the main North Coast Railway Line, situated just over halfway between Townsville and Cairns. By 10 December 1924, Tully was connected with both Townsville and Innisfail.

Schools

Tully State High School
Tully State High School has serviced students in the Tully district (comprising Cardwell, Kennedy, Mission Beach, Wongaling Beach, Tully, Feluga, El Arish and various other small centres) since its establishment in 1964. Tully State High School has an enrolment of approximately 630 students. As of 2016, Richard Graham is the principal of the school.

Tully State High School has been accredited as a Centre of Excellence in Mathematics, Science and Technology and is also one of only a few Reef Guardian schools. The campus is situated on extensive grounds, 38 hectares, and includes an aquaculture centre, a worm farm, an arboretum, a herd of cattle and several sports fields.

The high school was partially destroyed by Cyclone Yasi in 2011. B Block was completely destroyed and G Block was damaged. Both have since been rebuilt.

Tully State School
Tully State School caters to the educational needs of the town's primary school children. When erected in 1924, it was known as Banyan Provisional and has since gone through a number of name changes: Tully Provisional (1925); Tully State School (1926); Tully State Rural School (1934); Tully State Rural and High School (1951); and reverted to Tully State School in 1964. The school's current motto is "Work well and succeed".

St. Clare's Parish School
St. Clare's Catholic Primary School is a Catholic primary school.

Sport
Tully is the hometown to Indigenous boxer and 2008 Olympian, Paul Fleming.

Tully Tigers, is the local Rugby League club. One of their most famous juniors is former Cowboys forward Peter Jones. Tully was once one of the biggest sporting hubs in Far North Queensland, but since the economic crisis has hit, they are looking for more and more ways to support their clubs.

Tully is the last place reclusive All Black rugby player Keith Murdoch has been sighted.

Attractions
The Golden Gumboot is in the park on corner of Butler Street and Hort Street. Built in 2003, the Gumboot is 6.1 metres long and 7. 9 metres high; the height corresponds to highest annual rainfall in a populated area of Australia, which occurred in Tully in 1950. There is an  internal spiral staircase to the top of the boot which provides views of the town. A fiberglass green tree frog is climbing the side of the boot. There is a museum beside the boot with the history of the town's floods.

Military 
The Australian Army's Combat Training Centre – Jungle Training Wing (CTC-JTW), is located on the outskirts of Tully. JTW are the Australian Army's experts in jungle warfare, their primary role is to deliver basic and advanced jungle warfare training to dismounted Combat Team sized organizations. JTW are also heavily engaged in international exercises, often providing training to regional allies as their level of expertise is highly regarded in the international military community.

See also

 Kareeya Hydro Power Station
 List of tramways in Queensland

References

External links

 University of Queensland: Queensland Places: Tully
 Tully Sugar Limited

 
Towns in Queensland
Populated places in Far North Queensland
Cassowary Coast Region
Localities in Queensland